The Global Peter Drucker Forum is an international management conference dedicated to the management philosophy of Peter Drucker. Drucker, who lived from 1909 to 2005, was a management professor, writer, and consultant, frequently referred to as a "management guru." The Forum is held annually in November, in Drucker's home town of Vienna, Austria and is put on by the Peter Drucker Society Europe, an affiliate of the Drucker Institute at Claremont Graduate University.

Editions
The first Global Peter Drucker Forum was held on 19 November 2009, marking what would have been the 100th birthday of the late Peter Drucker.  The forum included presentations by management philosopher and author Charles Handy, Kellogg School of Management professor Philip Kotler, economist Peter Lorange, economist and consultant Fredmund Malik, C.K. Prahalad of the Stephen M. Ross School of Business and Simon-Kucher & Partners chairman Hermann Simon.

Drucker's widow, Doris, supported the forum prior to her death in 2014.

Peter Drucker Challenge
The Peter Drucker Challenge was added to the Forum in 2010. The challenge is an essay competition open to young business leaders. The topic of the challenge changes annually but is related to the works of Peter Drucker.

2019 Challenge
The 2019 Peter Drucker Challenge concerned the "Value of the Renaissance Manager," explicitly linked to the 500th anniversary of the passing of Leonardo Da Vinci. The Jury was composed of Stephan Güldenberg, Piero Formica, Delphine Jumelle-Paulet, and Julia Kirby.

2011 Challenge
The 2011 Peter Drucker Challenge focused on the topic of, "management, what is it good for?". The competition closed in August and the winners were announced by Peter Drucker Society Europe. Jury was composed of Deepa Prahalad, John Peters and Elizabeth Haas Edersheim.

2010 Challenge
The 2010 Peter Drucker Challenge received 214 entries. The competition was judged by Danica Purg, who was named "Dean of the year" by the Academy for International Business, chief executive for Emerald Group Publishing John Peters and author Elizabeth Haas-Edersheim. The judges selected 12 top essayists, with first place going to Florian Ramseger.

References

External links
 
 Peter Drucker Challenge
 The Drucker Institute

Business conferences
Recurring events established in 2009
Organisations based in Vienna
International conferences in Austria
2009 establishments in Austria